The Serenade for flute, violin and viola, Op. 25, is a chamber composition by Ludwig van Beethoven. It is in the key of D major.

Composition
The serenade was written by Beethoven around 1801, though there are preliminary sketches from 1797 when Beethoven finished his earlier serenade Op. 8. The work was definitely finished by late 1801 when Beethoven offered it the publisher G. Cappi. In 1803, Franz Xaver Kleinheinz arranged the serenade for flute (or violin) and piano. Beethoven checked and approved this arrangement and it was printed as his Op. 41. Similar to his Septet of the same period, the work had great popular appeal and was profitable for the young composer.

Structure
The work consists of six movements:
Entrata, Allegro
Tempo ordinario d'un Menuetto
Allegro molto
Andante con Variazioni
Allegro scherzando e vivace
Adagio – Allegro vivace e disinvolto

Notes

External links

Compositions by Ludwig van Beethoven
1801 compositions
Chamber music by Ludwig van Beethoven
Compositions for flute
Compositions for viola
Compositions in D major